John Tromp is a Dutch computer scientist. He formerly worked for Dutch Centre for Mathematics and Computer Science. Tromp discovered the number of legal states of the board game Go, and co-authored with Bill Taylor the Tromp-Taylor Rules, which they call "the logical rules of Go".

He is also known for Binary combinatory logic (Binary lambda calculus).

References

External links
John Tromp's homepage at GitHub

Living people
Dutch computer scientists
Year of birth missing (living people)